The Nilgiri Mountains form part of the Western Ghats in northwestern Tamil Nadu, Southern Karnataka, and eastern Kerala in India. They are located at the trijunction of three states and connect the Western Ghats with the Eastern Ghats.

Etymology
The word Nilgiri, comes from a mixture of Tamil and Sanskrit words neelam (blue) + giri (mountain), has been in use since at least 1117 CE. In Tamil literature it is mentioned as Iraniyamuttam It is thought that the bluish flowers of kurinji shrubs gave rise to the name.

Location
The Nilgiri Hills are separated from the Karnataka Plateau to the north by the Moyar River. 

Three national parks border portions of the Nilgiri mountains. Mudumalai National Park lies in the northern part of the range where Kerala, Karnataka, and Tamil Nadu meet, covering an area of 321 km². Mukurthi National Park lies in the southwest part of the range, in Kerala, covering an area of 78.5 km², which includes intact shola-grassland mosaic, habitat for the Nilgiri tahr. Silent Valley National Park lies just to the south and contiguous with those two parks, covering an area of 89.52 km².

Conservation
The Nilgiri Hills are part of the Nilgiri Biosphere Reserve (itself part of the UNESCO World Network of Biosphere Reserves.), and form a part of the protected bio-reserves in India.

History
The high steppes of the Nilgiri Hills have been inhabited since prehistoric times, demonstrated by a large number of artifacts unearthed by excavators. A particularly important collection from the region can be seen in the British Museum, including those assembled by colonial officers James Wilkinson Breeks, Major M. J. Walhouse and Sir Walter Elliot.

The first recorded use of the word Nila applied to this region can be traced back to 1117 CE. In the report of a general of Vishnuvardhana, King of Hoysalas, who in reference to his enemies, claimed to have "frightened the Todas, driven the Kongas underground, slaughtered the Poluvas, put to death the Maleyalas, terrified Chieftain Kala Nirpala and then proceeded to offer the peak of Nila Mountain.(presumably Doddabetta or Rangaswami peak of Peranganad in East Nilgiris) to Lakshmi, Goddess of Wealth. Neelagiri was ruled by Baduga King Kala Raja before 1117 CE."

A hero stone (Veeragallu) with a Kannada inscription at Vazhaithottam (Bale thota) in the Nilgiri District, dated to 10th century CE, has been discovered. A Kannada inscription of Hoysala king Ballala III (or his subordinate Madhava Dannayaka's son) from the 14th century CE has been discovered at the Siva (or Vishnu) temple at Nilagiri Sadarana Kote (present-day Dannayakana Kote), near the junction of Moyar and Bhavani rivers, but the temple has since been submerged by the Bhavani Sagar dam.

In 1814, as part of the Great Trigonometrical Survey, a sub-assistant named Keys and an apprentice named McMahon ascended the hills by the Danaynkeucottah (Dannayakana Kote) Pass, penetrated into the remotest parts, made plans, and sent in reports of their discoveries. As a result of these accounts, Messrs. Whish and Kindersley, two young Madras civilians, ventured up in pursuit of some criminals taking refuge in the mountains, and proceeded to observe the interior. They soon saw and felt enough favorable climate and terrain to excite their own curiosity, and that of others.

After the early 1820s, the hills were developed rapidly under the British Raj, because most of the land was already privately owned by British citizens. It was a popular summer and weekend getaway for the British during the colonial days. In 1827, Ooty became the official sanatorium and the summer capital of the Madras Presidency. Many winding hill roads were built. In 1899, the Nilgiri Mountain Railway was completed by influential and enterprising British citizens, with venture capital from the Madras government.

In the 19th century, when the British Straits Settlement shipped Chinese convicts to be jailed in India, the Chinese men settled in the Nilgiri mountains near Naduvattam after their release and married Tamil Paraiyan women, having mixed Chinese-Tamil children with them. They were documented by Edgar Thurston.

Peaks in the Nilgiris

The highest point in the Nilgiris and the southern extent of the range is Doddabetta Peak, 4 km east southeast of Udhagamandalam, .

Closely linked peaks in the west of Doddabetta range and nearby Udhagamandalam include:
 Kolaribetta: height: 
 Makurni (2594 m)
 Hecuba: 
 Kattadadu: 
 Kulkudi: 

Snowdon (height:  is the northern extent of the range. Club Hill and Elk Hill  are significant elevations in this range. Snowdon, Club Hill and Elk Hill with Doddabetta, form the impressive Udhagamandalam Valley.

Devashola, notable for its blue gum trees, is in the south of Doddabetta range.

Kulakombai is east of the Devashola.  The Bhavani Valley and the Lambton's peak range of Coimbatore district stretch from here.

Muttunadu Betta  is about 5 km, north northwest of Udhagamandalam. Tamrabetta (Coppery Hill)  is about 8 km southeast of Udhagamandalam. Vellangiri (Silvery Hill) is 16 km west-northwest of Udhagamandalam.

Waterfalls

Nearby is the  Halashana falls. The second highest is Catherine Falls, near Kotagiri, with a  fall, named after the wife of M.D. Cockburn, believed to have introduced coffee plantations to the Nilgiri Hills. The  Kalhatti Falls is off the Segur Peak. The Karteri Fall, near Aruvankadu had the first power station which supplied the original Cordite Factory with electricity. Law's Fall, near Coonoor, is interesting due to its association with the engineer Major G. C. Law who supervised building of the Coonoor Ghat road.

Flora and fauna

Over 2,800 species of flowering plants, 160 species of fern and fern allies, countless types of flowerless plants, mosses, fungi, algae, and land lichens are found in the sholas of the Nilgiris. No other hill station has as many species. It is also home to mammals like the Bengal tiger, Indian elephant, Indian leopard, chital deer, gaur, sambar deer, dhole, golden jackal, Indian boar, Nilgiri tahr, Indian spotted chevrotain, black buck, Asian palm civet, sloth bear, four-horned antelope, Nilgiri marten, Indian crested porcupine, Malabar giant squirrel, honey badger, Indian grey mongoose, Indian pangolin, Indian fox, smooth coated otter, and painted bat. The Indian python, king cobra, common krait, Indian cobra, Malabar pit viper, Nilgiri keelback, Oriental garden lizard, Eryx whitakeri and mugger crocodile are reptiles found here. Primates include the lion tailed macaque, Nilgiri langur, gray langur and bonnet macaque. The birds found here are Indian peacock, Nilgiri laughing thrush, Nilgiri flycatcher, grey junglefowl, Malabar pied hornbill, Malabar parakeet, great hornbill, Nilgiri wood pigeon, Indian vulture, black-hooded oriole, grey-headed bulbul and Malabar grey hornbill. Amphibians on the list are the purple frog,  Silent valley brush frog, Malabar gliding frog, Beddomixalus and many more. It is the only place in South India to have the white tiger. 

The dominant type of habitat is tropical rainforest. Montane forests and tropical moist forests are also found here. Much of the forest habitats have been much disturbed or destroyed by extensive tea plantations, easy motor-vehicle access, extensive commercial planting and harvesting of non-native eucalyptus and wattle (Acacia dealbata, Acacia mearnsii) plantations, and cattle grazing. The area also features one large and several smaller hydro-electric impoundments. Scotch broom has become an ecologically damaging invasive species.

Threatened plants of the Nilgiris include:

 Vulnerable species: Miliusa nilagirica, Nothapodytes foetida,  Commelina wightii
 Rare species: Ceropegia decaisneana Ceropegia pusilla, Senecio kundaicus
 Endangered species: Youngia nilgiriensis, Impatiens neo-barnesii, Impatiens nilagirica, Euonymus angulatus and Euonymus serratifolius.

References

External links

Mountains of the Western Ghats
Mountain ranges of India
Tourist attractions in Nilgiris district
Landforms of Tamil Nadu
Geography of Coimbatore